William R. Sears (May 25, 1928 – June 26, 1998) was an American politician from New York.

Life
He was born on May 25, 1928, in Utica, Oneida County, New York, the son of Edward J. Sears (1904–1964) and Gladys (née Waldron) Sears (1903–1977). He attended Our Lady of Lourdes School, St. Francis de Sales High School, and Utica College. He married Anne Miller (1928–1989). They lived in Woodgate. He entered politics  as a Republican.

He was a member of the New York State Assembly from 1966 to 1990, sitting in the 176th, 177th, 178th, 179th, 180th, 181st, 182nd, 183rd, 184th, 185th, 186th, 187th and 188th New York State Legislatures.

He was a member of the New York State Senate from 1991–96, sitting in the 189th, 190th and 191st New York State Legislatures. In March 1996, he announced that he would not seek re-election later that year.

Death
He died on June 26, 1998 in a motor vehicle accident on Bear Creek Road in Woodgate, near the railroad tracks, and was buried at the White Lake Cemetery in Woodgate.

References

External links
 

1928 births
1998 deaths
Politicians from Utica, New York
Republican Party New York (state) state senators
Republican Party members of the New York State Assembly
Utica University alumni
20th-century American politicians